George Bishop (21 August 1785, in Leicester – 14 June 1861), was a noted English astronomer of the nineteenth century.

Early life and fortune 
At the age of eighteen Bishop entered a British wine-making business in London, subsequently becoming its proprietor, during his tenure at which the business was so successful that its excise returns were said to exhibit half of all home-made wines as of his manufacture. Bishop's scientific career began with his admission to the Royal Astronomical Society in 1830, funded by the money he had earned from the wine business. He took lessons in algebra from Augustus De Morgan, with a view to reading Pierre-Simon Laplace's five volume work Mécanique Céleste (Celestial Mechanics), by the age of fifty achieving his goal of sufficient mathematical knowledge to comprehend the scope of its methods.

Career in astronomy 
In 1836 Bishop was able to realise a long-held intention by erecting an astronomical observatory near his residence at the South Villa of Regent's Park, on which he spared no expense in order to ensure that it would be of practical use. "I am determined," he said when choosing its site, "that this observatory shall do something."

A testimonial was awarded to Bishop by the Royal Astronomical Society in 1848 "for the foundation of an observatory leading to various astronomical discoveries" and presented to him with a warmly commendatory address by Sir John Herschel.

He acted as secretary to the society from 1833 to 1839 and as treasurer from 1840 to 1857, and was chosen president in two successive years, 1857 and 1858, although the state of his health rendered him unable to take the chair. Bishop was elected a Fellow of the Royal Society on 9 June 1848, was also a fellow of the Royal Society of Arts, and sat for some years on the council of University College.

After a long period of physical illness, but during which he retained his mental faculties, Bishop died on 14 June 1861 at the age of 76.

Publications 
 Astronomical Observations taken at the Observatory, South Villa, Regent's Park, during the years 1839-51, including a catalogue of double stars observed by Dawes and Hind, with valuable "historical and descriptive notes" by the latter, observations of new planets and comets, and of the temporary star discovered by Hind in Ophiuchus 27 April 1848, and a description of the observatory; London: Taylor, Walton and Maberly, 1852.

References

External links 
 Astronomical Observations taken at the Observatory, South Villa, Regent's Park, during the years 1839-51 on Google Books

1785 births
1861 deaths
19th-century British astronomers
Fellows of the Royal Society
Presidents of the Royal Astronomical Society
Burials at Kensal Green Cemetery